Hollywood Zap! is a 1986 American comedy film written and directed by Canadian filmmaker David Cohen (no relation to David X. Cohen) and distributed by Troma Entertainment, a company known for its low-budget exploitation films.

Reception
In 2001, the film was featured at the 1st annual Video Game Festival to examine gaming's impact on media and culture. Described as being "historically significant", the film was sponsored by Twin Galaxies Intergalactic Scoreboard, the official international electronic scoreboard for video games.

Plot
Two young men hit the road to Hollywood, CA to look for money, fame, and the wild life in this youthful comedy. Tucker "Downer" Downs tires of his boring job as a clerk in a women's fashion outlet and heads West. He also hopes that he will find his father, who disappeared 24 years before. En route, Downs hooks up with wasted video addict/hustler Nash. Together they have many adventures during their trek to Tinsel Town.

The film is a black comedy of failed expectations and disillusion.  Ultimately both men must confront the reality that dreams often do not come true.

References

External links
 
 
 

1986 films
1980s black comedy films
1980s buddy comedy films
1980s sex comedy films
1986 independent films
1980s English-language films
American black comedy films
American buddy comedy films
American independent films
Films about video games
Films set in Los Angeles
Films set in Mississippi
Nerd culture
Punk films
Transgender-related films
Troma Entertainment films
Teen sex comedy films
1980s American films